Jonathan Breyne (born 4 January 1991) is a Belgian cyclist, who currently rides for Belgian amateur team Gaverzicht–BE Okay.

In 2013, Breyne was accused of using illegal drugs following the discovery of clenbuterol in a sample taken following his participation in the Japan Cup. Breyne was cleared by the  Union Cycliste Internationale, who accepted the drug had entered his system as a result of eating contaminated meat while taking part in a race in China.

Major results
2008
 1st  Overall Keizer der Juniores
2009
 1st Stage 2 Ster van Zuid-Limburg
 1st Stage 5 Coupe Du Président De La Ville De Grudziadz   
 1st Stage 3 Trophée Centre Morbihan
2010
 1st  Time trial, National Under-23 Road Championships
2012
 2nd Grand Prix Criquielion
2013
 8th Overall Tour of Taihu Lake
1st Stage 8
2015
 6th UAE Cup

References

External links

1991 births
Living people
Belgian male cyclists
People from Menen
Cyclists from West Flanders
21st-century Belgian people